Radley is an unincorporated community in Crawford County, Kansas, United States.  As of the 2020 census, the population of the community and nearby areas was 105.

History
A post office was opened in Radley in 1913, and remained in operation until it was discontinued in 1988.

Demographics

For statistical purposes, the United States Census Bureau has defined Radley as a census-designated place (CDP).

References

Further reading

External links
 Crawford County maps: Current, Historic, KDOT

Unincorporated communities in Crawford County, Kansas
Unincorporated communities in Kansas